This list is about incidents of civil unrest, rioting, violent labor disputes, or minor insurrections or revolts in Baltimore, Maryland.

 1835 - Baltimore bank riot, occurred August 6 through 9 following the failure of the Bank of Maryland
 1856 - Know-Nothing Riot of 1856, occurred in the fall of that year following the October municipal election
 1861 - Baltimore Riot of 1861, occurred on April 19 between antiwar Democrats, Confederate sympathizers, and members of the Massachusetts militia
 1877 - Baltimore railroad strike, occurred from June 16 to 29 as part of the Great Railroad Strike of 1877
 1968 - Baltimore riot of 1968, occurred from April 6 to 14 following the assassination of Martin Luther King Jr.
 1974 - Baltimore municipal strike of 1974, occurred June 30 through July 14 and began when waste collector sought higher wages and better working conditions
 2015 - 2015 Baltimore protests, occurred April 12 following the death of Freddie Gray while in police custody

See also
 List of incidents of civil unrest in the United States
 Lists of Incidents of unrest and violence in the United States by city
 List of riots (notable incidents of civil disorder worldwide)

References

Incidents of civil unrest in Baltimore
civil unrest
History of Baltimore